"Snipe" (stylized as "snIpe") is a maxi single released by the J-pop singer, Kotoko. Released on June 24, 2009, this single is also contained in the I've Sound 10th Anniversary 「Departed to the future」 Special CD BOX, released on March 25, 2009.

The accompanying song, "Close to Me...: I've in Budokan 2009 Live Ver.", is the live version of her first visual novel theme song with I've Sound that she performed in their concert in Budokan on January 2, 2009.

The single only came in a limited CD+DVD edition (GNCV-0018). The DVD will contain the Promotional Video for snIpe.

Track listing 
Snipe—5:05
Lyrics: Kotoko
Composition/Arrangement: Maiko Iuchi
Close to Me...: I've in Budokan 2009 Live Ver. -- 3:42
Lyrics: Kotoko
Composition/Arrangement: Kazuya Takase
Snipe (instrumental) -- 5:05

I've Sound 10th Anniversary 「Departed to the future」 Special CD BOX

References

2009 singles
Kotoko (singer) songs
2009 songs
Song recordings produced by I've Sound
Songs with lyrics by Kotoko (musician)